Rangkasbitung Station (RK) is a railway station located in East Muara Ciujung, Rangkasbitung, Lebak Regency, Banten.

Rangkasbitung Station is the main station of Lebak Regency. This station has a small rail yard to keep passenger coaches and goods carriages. All train services that pass this station stop in this station.

Since 1 April 2017, KRL Commuterline commenced operations from Tanah Abang Station to Rangkasbitung Station, formerly terminating at Maja Station.

History 
In the past, there was a branch for the railroad line to Labuan via Pandeglang which has been inactive since 1984. On this line there is another branch for the line at Saketi to Bayah; it was built by Japanese prisoners of war better known as romusha during the Japanese occupation during the World War II. Thousands of people died because of the inhuman treatment of the Japanese soldiers. Branch lines are included in the reactivation master plan.

Building and layout 
This station has four active lines.  Initially, line 1 was a straight line. After the Maja–Rangkasbitung double track was officially operated in line with the enactment of the 2019 train travel chart on December 1, 2019, line 1 is now only used as a double track straight line from the direction of Jakarta, while line 2 is used as a double track straight line towards Jakarta as well as a double track and single track from and towards Merak.

At this station there is also a train depot and a locomotive depot which store and maintain the flat carriages used for the Babarandek and Baja Coil trains as well as the Merak Local Train series and the locomotives that are given the task of pulling them. There is also a KRL depot which was built together with the construction of the double track.

The old station building which was a legacy of the Staatsspoorwegen has now been designated as a cultural heritage by PT KAI's Center for Preservation and Architectural Design Unit. Currently, on the west side of the old building, there is a new building in the form of a waiting room which is reserved for KRL passengers only, while the old building is used as a special waiting room for Merak Local Train passengers.

Services
The following is a list of train services at the Rangkasbitung Station.

Passenger services
 Local economy class
 Lokal Merak, towards 
 KRL Commuterline
  Green Line, towards  (Rangkasbitung branch)

Defunct services
 Kalimaya express local (Merak-Tanah Abang)
 Langsam local (Rangkasbitung-Angke)
 Rangkas Jaya express local (Rangkasbitung-Tanah Abang)
 Patas Merak rapid local (Merak-Tanah Abang)(Now called Lokal Merak with shortened route from Merak to Rangkasbitung)
 Krakatau intercity (Merak-Kediri via Tanah Abang)

References

External links

Lebak Regency
Railway stations in Banten
Railway stations opened in 1899